Biancaea sappan is a species of flowering tree in the legume family, Fabaceae, that is native to tropical Asia. Common names in English include sappanwood and Indian redwood. It was previously ascribed to the genus Caesalpinia. Sappanwood is related to brazilwood (Paubrasilia echinata), and was itself called brasilwood in the Middle Ages.

Biancaea sappan can be infected by twig dieback (Lasiodiplodia theobromae).

This plant has many uses. It has antibacterial and anticoagulant properties. It also produces a valuable reddish dye called brazilin, used for dyeing fabric as well as making red paints and inks. Slivers of heartwood are used for making herbal drinking water in various regions, such as Kerala, Karnataka and Central Java, where it is usually mixed with ginger, cinnamon, and cloves. The heartwood also contains juglone (5-hydroxy-1,4-naphthoquinone), which has antimicrobial activity. Homoisoflavonoids (sappanol, episappanol, 3'-deoxysappanol, 3'-O-methylsappanol, 3'-O-methylepisappanol and sappanone A) can also be found in B. sappan.

The wood is somewhat lighter in color than brazilwood and other related trees. Sappanwood was a major trade good during the 17th century, when it was exported from Southeast Asian nations (especially Thailand) aboard red seal ships to Japan.

Gallery

Notes

References

External links

Caesalpinieae
Flora of tropical Asia
Trees of China
Least concern plants
Least concern biota of Asia
Plants described in 1753
Taxa named by Carl Linnaeus
Plant dyes